A cycler is a potential spacecraft on a closed transfer orbit that would pass close to two celestial bodies at regular intervals. Cyclers could be used for carrying heavy supplies, life support and radiation shielding.

Free return trajectory
A free-return trajectory is a symmetrical orbit past the moon and Earth that was first analysed by Arthur Schwaniger

Lunar cycler

A lunar cycler or Earth–Moon cycler is a cycler orbit, or spacecraft therein, which periodically passes close by the Earth and the Moon, using gravity assists and occasional propellant-powered corrections to maintain its trajectories between the two. If the fuel required to reach a particular cycler orbit from both the Earth and the Moon is modest, and the travel time between the two along the cycler is reasonable, then having a spacecraft in the cycler can provide an efficient and regular method for space transportation.

Mars cycler

A Mars cycler or Earth–Mars cycler is a spacecraft trajectory that encounters the Earth and Mars on a regular basis, or a spacecraft on such a trajectory

Interstellar cycler

An interstellar cycler or Schroeder cycler, a theoretical spacecraft trajectory that encounters two or more stars on a regular basis, or a spacecraft on such a trajectory

References

Space
Spacecraft

fr:Cycler